Baliothrips is a genus of insects belonging to the family Thripidae.

The species of this genus are found in Europe and Northern America.

Species:
 Baliothrips dispar (Haliday, 1836) 
 Baliothrips kroli (Schille, 1912)

References

Thripidae
Thrips genera